Dami Aqa (also Romanized as Damī Āqā; also known as Dey Āqā) is a village in Hablerud Rural District, in the Central District of Firuzkuh County, Tehran Province, Iran. At the 2006 census, its population was 107, in 28 families.

References 

Populated places in Firuzkuh County